These are tables showing the physical characteristics of Earth.

Earth dimensions

Continents and population

Structure of the Earth